This is an incomplete list of some of the more famous mosques around the world.

List

See also 
 Islamic architecture
 Lists of mosques
 List of largest mosques
 List of the oldest mosques in the world
 List of mosques that are mentioned by name in the Quran
 List of mosques in the Arab League
 List of mosques in the United Arab Emirates
 List of mosques in Africa
 List of mosques in Algeria
 List of mosques in Egypt
 List of mosques in Asia
 List of mosques in Afghanistan
 List of mosques in Armenia
 List of mosques in Azerbaijan
 List of mosques in Bangladesh
 List of mosques in China
 List of mosques in Hong Kong
 List of mosques in India
 List of mosques in Indonesia
 List of mosques in Iran
 List of mosques in Iraq
 List of mosques in Israel
 List of mosques in Japan
 List of mosques in Kuwait
 List of mosques in Malaysia
 List of mosques in Pakistan
 List of mosques in Singapore
 List of mosques in Syria
 List of mosques in Taiwan
 List of mosques in Thailand
 List of mosques in Europe
 List of mosques in Cyprus
 List of mosques in France
 List of mosques in Germany
 List of mosques in the Netherlands
 List of mosques in the United Kingdom
 List of mosques in Scandinavia
 List of mosques in Turkey
 List of mosques in the Americas
 List of mosques in the United States
 List of mosques in Canada
 List of mosques in Oceania
 List of Hindu temples
 List of Buddhist temples
 Lists of cathedrals

References

External links 

 Directory of Mosques World Wide
 Directory of Mosques in the US/Canada/UK/Europe/Australia
 Directory of Mosques in South Africa

 Famous